Friedrich August Brand (20 December 1735 – 9 October 1806) was an Austrian painter.

The son of Christian Hülfgott Brand, he was born at Vienna. He was a member of the Imperial Academy, and died at Vienna in 1806. He painted several historical subjects and landscapes, which are favourably spoken of by the German authors, and engraved some plates, both with the point and with the graver, in the use of which he was instructed by Schmutzer. His known works include the following:

The Breakfast; after Torenvliet
A View near Nuisdorf
View of the Garden of Schoenbrunn
Banditti attacking a Carriage
The Entrance to the Town of Crems

Among his students was the long-standing professor of landscape painting at the Academy of Fine Arts Vienna, Joseph Mössmer.

References

Attribution:
 

18th-century Austrian painters
18th-century Austrian male artists
Austrian male painters
19th-century Austrian painters
19th-century Austrian male artists
Austrian engravers
1735 births
1806 deaths
Artists from Vienna
Academic staff of the Academy of Fine Arts Vienna
18th-century engravers
19th-century engravers